Zenzo Ngqobe is a South African actor.  He is known for portraying Butcher in Gavin Hood's 2005 Oscar-winning film Tsotsi.  He is also known for portraying Atang in the 2013 film The Forgotten Kingdom.  For his work in the television series The River, Ngqobe was nominated for the 2019 SAFTA Award for Best Supporting Actor in a Telenovela.

Select filmography
Tsotsi (2005)
Blood Diamond (2006)
The Forgotten Kingdom (2013)
Mandela: Long Walk to Freedom (2013)

References

External links
 

21st-century South African male actors
South African male film actors
South African male television actors
Living people
Year of birth missing (living people)